In computer animation, a T-pose, also known as a bind pose or reference pose, is a default posing for a 3D model's skeleton before it is animated. It is called so because of its shape: the straight legs and arms of a humanoid model combine to form a capital letter T. When the arms are angled downwards, the pose is sometimes referred to as an A-pose instead. Likewise, if the arms are angled upward, it is called a Y-pose.

Usage

The T-pose is primarily used as the default pose in animation software, which is then manipulated to create animations.

Outside of being default poses in animation software, T-poses are typically used as placeholders for animations not yet completed, particularly in 3D animated video games. In some motion capture software, a T-pose must be assumed by the actor in the motion capture suit before motion capturing can begin. There are other poses used, but this is the most common one.

As an Internet meme

Starting in 2016 and resurfacing in 2017, the T-pose specifically has become a widespread Internet meme due to its bizarre and non sequitur appearance, especially in video game glitches where there would otherwise be an animation. As an Internet meme, it is often used to convey the idea of asserting dominance over others.

In a prerelease video of the game NBA Elite 11, the demo was filled with glitches, notably one unintentionally showing a T-pose in place of the proper animation for the model of player Andrew Bynum. The glitch later gained fame as the "Jesus Bynum glitch". Publisher EA eventually cancelled the game as they found it unsatisfactory. A similar occurrence happened with Cyberpunk 2077.

See also
Vitruvian Man, a diagram by Leonardo da Vinci with the figure of a man making a T and a jack

References 

Visual effects
3D imaging
3D graphics software
3D computer graphics
Computer graphics
Internet memes
Internet memes introduced in the 2010s
Internet memes introduced in 2010
Internet memes introduced in 2017